Grels Olof Teir (26 February 1916, Lappfjärd – 23 June 1999) was a Finnish lawyer and politician. He served as Minister of Transport and Public Works from 12 September 1964 to 27 May 1966, Minister of Trade and Industry from 22 March 1968 to 14 May 1970 and again from 4 September to 31 December 1972, and Deputy Minister of Social Affairs and Health from 13 June to 30 November 1975. 

He was a member of the Parliament of Finland from 1951 to 1975, representing the Swedish People's Party of Finland (SFP).

References

1916 births
1999 deaths
People from Kristinestad
People from Vaasa Province (Grand Duchy of Finland)
Swedish-speaking Finns
Swedish People's Party of Finland politicians
Ministers of Transport and Public Works of Finland
Ministers of Trade and Industry of Finland
Members of the Parliament of Finland (1951–54)
Members of the Parliament of Finland (1954–58)
Members of the Parliament of Finland (1958–62)
Members of the Parliament of Finland (1962–66)
Members of the Parliament of Finland (1966–70)
Members of the Parliament of Finland (1970–72)
Members of the Parliament of Finland (1972–75)